is a Japanese politician of the New Komeito Party, a member of the House of Councillors in the Diet (national legislature). A native of Tanno, Hokkaidō, he graduated from Kitami Institute of Technology and received a Ph.D. from Hokkaido University. He was elected to the House of Councillors for the first time in 1995 as a member of the New Frontier Party.

He has served as the Deputy Minister of the Environment and Deputy Secretary General of the Komeito Party.

References

External links 
  in Japanese.

Members of the House of Councillors (Japan)
Living people
1947 births
New Frontier Party (Japan) politicians
20th-century Japanese politicians
New Komeito politicians
Hokkaido University alumni